Andrew Goudie may refer to:

 Andrew Goudie (geographer) (born 1945), former Master of St Cross College, Oxford, England
 Andrew Goudie (economist) (born 1955), Chief Economic Adviser to the Scottish Government

See also
Goudie (surname)